Elizabeth M. Olmsted (Allen; December 31, 1825 – February 7, 1910) was an American poet of the long nineteenth century. Her poems were well known during the Civil War, and appeared in the newspapers and magazines of that period.

Biography
Elizabeth Martha Allen was born in Caledonia, New York, December 31, 1825. Her ancestral stock was from Pittsfield, Massachusetts. Her father, Oliver Allen, belonged to the family of Ethan Allen. She was educated carefully and liberally. She was a child of strong mental powers and inquiring mind. Her poetic trend was apparent in childhood, and in her youth she wrote poems of much merit. She married, in February, 1853, John R. Olmsted, of Le Roy, New York, and she resided in that town thereafter. The Olmsleds descended from the first settlers of Hartford, Connecticut, and pioneers of the Genesee valley.

Olmsted contributed to the New York City weekly Independent and other papers. During the civil war, she wrote many spirited war lyrics, among which was the once well-known "Our Boys Going to the War" and "The Clarion." Her poem, "The Upas," first appeared in the Independent of January 16, 1862. She published a number of excellent sonnets. Her productions were characterized by moral tone, fine diction and polish.

She died at her son's home in Buffalo, February 7, 1910, and was buried at Machpelah Cemetery, Le Roy, New York.

Selected works

 Poems of the house, and other poems, 1903

References

Attribution

External links
 
 

1825 births
1910 deaths
19th-century American poets
19th-century American women writers
People from Caledonia, New York
Poets from New York (state)
American women poets
Wikipedia articles incorporating text from A Woman of the Century